"Loves Me Like a Rock" is a song by the American singer-songwriter Paul Simon. It was the second single from his third studio album, There Goes Rhymin' Simon (1973), released on Columbia Records. It features background vocals from the Dixie Hummingbirds, a Southern black gospel group. Although the lyrics are not typically associated with gospel music, the Dixie Hummingbirds were eager to record the song with Simon, and they recorded their own version soon after for their 1973 album We Love You Like a Rock/Every Day and Every Hour.

The song peaked at number two on the Billboard Hot 100; it was also a top five hit in Canada. It was certified gold by the Recording Industry Association of America for sales of over one million copies.

Lyrics and music
According to Billboard magazine, the lyrics of "Loves Me Like a Rock" describe "how a mother loved her son, even when he became the president" and the music has a quasi-gospel flavor.  Cash Box said that the song combines "the grace of Simon with a touch of gospel."

Chart performance
Paul Simon's version of "Loves Me Like a Rock" peaked at number two on the Billboard Hot 100 chart the week of October 6, 1973, kept from the summit by Cher's "Half-Breed". It remained in the Top 40 for 14 weeks and was certified a gold record. It also spent two weeks atop the Billboard easy listening chart in September 1973. It reached the Top 40 in the United Kingdom, peaking at number 39 on the UK Singles Chart.
The gospel version of "Loves Me Like a Rock" by the Dixie Hummingbirds reached number 72 on the Billboard R&B chart and won the group a Grammy for Best Soul Gospel performance in 1974.

Weekly charts

Year-end charts

Certifications

Personnel
 Paul Simon - vocals, 6 and 12-string acoustic guitars
 David Hood - bass
 Roger Hawkins - brushed drums, tambourine
 The Dixie Hummingbirds - backing vocals

Appearances in other media
Paul Simon made a promotional appearance on The Muppet Show in 1980 in support of his movie and album One-Trick Pony. The show ended with a performance of "Loves Me Like a Rock" featuring the Muppets.
 
The song was featured in the end credits of the 2005 film Zathura: A Space Adventure. 

Christian rock band Third Day covered the song on their 2017 album Revival.

See also
List of number-one adult contemporary singles of 1973 (U.S.)

References

External links
 

1973 songs
1973 singles
Paul Simon songs
Cashbox number-one singles
Songs written by Paul Simon
Song recordings produced by Phil Ramone
Song recordings produced by Paul Simon
Columbia Records singles